The Wabash Bridge is a railroad bridge over the Ohio River between the states of West Virginia and Ohio. It was the longest cantilever truss span for a short time when it was built. The bridge is also noted for its decorative finials on top of the towers. With its eastern end located on Route 2 in West Virginia, between Follansbee and Wellsburg, it was also a popular route for foot traffic from Follansbee and Wellsburg to Mingo Junction in Ohio. Streetcar service was provided on the West Virginia side to the steps leading to the footpath along the bridge.

Specifications
Service  -   Railroad (Wheeling and Lake Erie) over the Ohio River 
Location   -   Mingo Junction, Ohio and Rural Brooke County, West Virginia 
Structure Type   -  Metal Cantilever Rivet  -  Baltimore Through Truss
Construction Date    -   1904
Builder/Contractor   - American Bridge Company of New York, New York
Main Span Length  -  
Structure Length  -  
Spans  -  3 Main Span(s)

References

Railroad bridges in Ohio
Railroad bridges in West Virginia
Bridges over the Ohio River
Bridges completed in 1904
Cantilever bridges in the United States
Truss bridges in the United States
Metal bridges in the United States